Zacorisca chrysomelopa is a species of moth of the family Tortricidae. It is found in New Zealand.

References

	

Moths described in 1927
Zacorisca